Hahnemühle FineArt, Inc. is a paper manufacturing company in the Relliehausen district of Dassel, Germany.  It is a significant producer of coated paper for inkjet printing, artist's paper for traditional painting and printing techniques, and filter paper for industry and research.

History
The company traces its origins to the construction of a paper mill by Merton Speiss on 27 February 1584 in Relliehausen at the source of a river in the Solling (a range of hills). The filtration effect from the Solling's sandstone had a softening effect on the pure spring water leading to paper of exceptional quality. This is but one of many such paper mills known to have existed in the vicinity of Dassel between the Weser and the Leine rivers, but it is the only one to have survived over the centuries.

On 30 August 1769 the descendants of the Spiess family sold the mill to Peter Johann Jacob Heinrich Andrae from Osterode for 4,500 Reichsthaler. Andrae suffered an early death, and the mill passed to his son. On 13 August 1884 Oskar Andrae sold the firm to H. J. Heinemann of Hannover who immediately began the construction of a new production facility. Unforeseen difficulties and costs forced Heinemann to give up the factory, and it was sold in 1886 to Carl Hahne who renamed the mill into “Büttenpapierfabrik Hahnemühle”. In 1902 Hahnemühle was converted into a limited company (GmbH) and merged with Schleicher & Schuell, a company from Düren.

During the Second World War, the company created paper for the SS-Reichssicherheitshauptamt's efforts to produce counterfeit British banknotes as part of Operation Bernhard.

In 2004 Hahnemühle was separated from the Schleicher & Schuell group and has been independent again since then. It has subsidiaries in the USA, Great Britain, France, Singapore and China.

Product Portfolio

Traditional FineArt 
The Traditional FineArt range comprises various artists' papers - including genuine mould-made papers - and technical drawing papers. They have all been produced since 1584 according to old recipes, from high quality raw materials and with pure spring water from in different grammages and surface structures. All Hahnemühle papers are certified by independent institutes as highly resistant to ageing and they are vegan.

Digital FineArt 
Hahnemühle is the inventor of digital fineart papers for photographs, digital art and art reproductions. With the Digital FineArt Collection and the Hahnemühle Photo line, the paper manufacturer offers a high-quality and broad product range. Depending on the application, various inkjet papers are available that meet different quality requirements and artistic demands.  

With its combination of high-purity artist papers, characteristic surface structures and various inkjet coatings, the Digital FineArt Collection guarantees extraordinary printing results with brilliant colours, deep blacks, best contrast and detailed reproduction as well as captivating image depth. With an ageing resistance of more than 100 years, the inkjet media of the Digital FineArt Collection are ideally suited for fine art applications such as high-quality fine art prints, editions, long-term exhibitions and art collections.  

Hahnemühle Photo fills the gap to the Digital FineArt Collection and offers a compact basic range of universal standard inkjet papers for everyday use. Compared to the Digital FineArt Collection, the Hahnemühle Photo media have a non-textured paper base made of cellulose or a polyethylene-coated paper base, which are provided with an inkjet coating optimised for photo applications. The comparatively low thickness as well as the smooth surfaces ensure easy printability and processing. With a convincing print quality and an ageing resistance of up to 30 years, the papers of the Hahnemühle Photo line deliver best results in everyday printing and are suitable for photo applications such as photo and poster prints as well as photo books.

Fine Notes & Stationery FineArt 
Writing accessories from the new FineNotes product line are a reminiscence of Hahnemühle's history and writing culture. Extravagant writing instruments in limited editions are refined with a nickel-palladium alloy and quote, for example, patterns of historical scoop screens. Furthermore, elegant premium notebooks with the finest watermarked paper are part of the FineNotes collection for noble writing experiences.  

Hahnemühle sketch papers and sketch books for sketching, note taking and journaling are manufactured in the Stationery FineArt range.

Filtration & Life Science 
Hahnemühle has been producing filtration papers of the highest quality for more than 130 years. In the past, the papers were manufactured and marketed worldwide under the name Schleicher & Schuell. After the sale of Schleicher & Schuell (2004) Hahnemühle is an independent producer and supplier of technical papers and life science applications.  

Hahnemühle develops and produces speciality papers from more than 150 different paper grades made from linters, pulps and glass fibres for medical devices and diagnostics, the food industry or the chemical and pharmaceutical industries.

With the supply of carrier media for Covid 19 rapid tests, Hahnemühle advanced to become a system-relevant company. Novel, greatly improved filter media for masks of all kinds, which have an antiviral and anti-allergenic effect, extend the range of life science applications.

"Green" papers 
The tradition-rich manufacturer produces particularly sustainable papers from rapidly renewable plant fibres. The "Natural Line" product line for painting and drawing includes artists' papers made of bamboo, hemp and agave. Available are watercolour papers, sketching papers and papers for acrylic, charcoal, red chalk and mixed media. Papers made of bamboo, hemp, agave and Sugar Cane, a pulp from the sugar cane plant, are also available for fine art photo prints, digital art or art reproductions. Hahnemühle also produces the world's first publishing paper made from hemp for book and broshure printing, which can be used in digital or offset printing.

Environmental Initiative 
As early as 1965, Hahnemühle was the first paper manufacturer to produce exclusively vegan artists’ papers and does not use animal glues or other animal substrates in paper production. In addition, the paper mill covers its entire electricity requirements needed for production through wind, water and solar energy.

In 2008, Hahnemühle introduced the Bamboo paper grade in its Digital FineArt and traditional Artist Papers product ranges. All Bamboo papers are made from pulp from fast-growing bamboo grass. In recent years, an entire product line has been created around this product: the "Natural Line". This includes papers made from other sustainable raw materials such as hemp or agave. Some key environmentally friendly factors of these selected plants are that they require minimal maintenance, grow quickly and don't need any pesticides.

With the introduction of the sustainable papers in 2008, Hahnemühle founded its "Green Rooster" initiative. Through which, the company supports regional, national and international environmental protection and environmental education programmes. These projects are supported financially with a share of the profits from Hahnemühle's "Natural Line". So far, projects such as "Prints for Wildlife", "Wildlife observation in the Leinepolder area", "AufBÄUMEN gegen den Klimawandel"and many more have been supported.

Hahnemühle was recently certified for all its sustainability measures and its environmentally conscious actions according to the ISO 14001 guideline for environmental management.

Calendar Competition 
Hahnemühle publishes an exclusive art calendar every year. Until 2008, these calendars were designed with artwork by an artist or art studio.  Since 2008, Hahnemühle conducts an annual international painting competition. Every year, a jury chooses the artworks for the individual months. Since 2014, the competition has been open to all painting and drawing techniques; until then, participation was limited to watercolours. The theme of the competition is always eagerly awaited by art lovers and the number of participants as well as the number of artworks submitted is constantly increasing. 2017's calendar contest with the theme "Animals" saw a record number of participants. More than 2600 artworks from over 1100 artists from all over the world were submitted.

References

Bibliography 
 Wolfgang Hein / Wilhelm Willemer: Neutral geleimte Papiere für wertvolle Objekte. In: Dauerhaftigkeit von Papier: Vorträge des 4. Internationalen graphischen Restauratorentages, veranstaltet von der Internationalen Arbeitsgemeinschaft der Archiv-, Bibliotheks- und Graphikrestauratoren (IADA)in Zusammenarbeit mit der Niedersächsischen Staats-und Universitätsbibliothek Göttingen und dem Niedersächsischen Staatsarchiv Bückeburg 1979, Klostermann, Frankfurt/Main 1980.
 E. Tacke: Urkundliche Beiträge zur Geschichte der Papiermühle Relliehausen während der Zeit der Papiermacherfamilie Spieß 1584-1789. In: Jahresbericht des Vereins für Geschichte und Altertümer der Stadt Einbeck und Umgebung 21 (1953/54), pp. 48–56
 425 Jahre Hahnemühle 1584-2009

External links 
 Hahnemühle website
 About Hahnemühle
 History of Hahnemühle

Companies established in the 16th century
Organizations established in the 1580s
1584 establishments in the Holy Roman Empire
Manufacturing companies of Germany